|}

The Classic Novices' Hurdle is a Grade 2 National Hunt hurdle race in Great Britain which is open to horses aged four years or older. It is run on the New Course at Cheltenham over a distance of about 2 miles and 4½ furlongs (2 miles 4 furlongs and 56 yards, or 4,074 metres), and during its running there are ten hurdles to be jumped. The race is for novice hurdlers, and it is scheduled to take place each year in January. It was first run in 2005. It is currently sponsored by the Ballymore Group.

Records
Leading jockey  (4 wins):
 Barry Geraghty – Ambobo (2005), Bobs Worth (2011), Yanworth (2016), Birchdale (2019)

Leading trainer (4 wins):
 Nicky Henderson –  Aigle d'Or (2008), Bobs Worth (2011), Santini (2018), Birchdale (2019)  
 Alan King - Batonnier (2012), Ordo Ab Chao (2015), Yanworth (2016), North Lodge (2022)

Winners
{| class = "sortable" | border="1" style="border-collapse: collapse; font-size:90%"
|- bgcolor="#77dd77" align="center"
! width="36px" | Year
! width="160px" | Winner
! width="40px" | Age
! width="180px" | Jockey
! width="180px" | Trainer
|-
| 2005
| Ambobo
| 5
| Barry Geraghty
| Arnaud Chaillé-Chaillé
|- bgcolor="#eeeeee"
| 2006Abandoned due to frost
|-
| 2007
| Wichita Lineman
| 6
| Tony McCoy
| Jonjo O'Neill
|-
| 2008
| Aigle d'Or
| 5
| Marcus Foley
| Nicky Henderson
|-
| 2009
| Diamond Harry
| 6
| Timmy Murphy
| Nick Williams
|-
| 2010
| Restless Harry
| 6
| Henry Oliver
| Robin Dickin
|-
| 2011
| Bobs Worth
| 6
| Barry Geraghty
| Nicky Henderson
|-
| 2012
| Batonnier
| 6
| Wayne Hutchinson
| Alan King
|-
| 2013
| At Fishers Cross
| 6
| Tony McCoy
| Rebecca Curtis
|-
| 2014
| Red Sherlock
| 5
| Tom Scudamore
| David Pipe
|-
| 2015
| Ordo Ab Chao
| 6
| Wayne Hutchinson
| Alan King
|-
| 2016
| Yanworth
| 6
| Barry Geraghty
| Alan King
|-
| 2017
| Wholestone
| 6
| Daryl Jacob
| Nigel Twiston-Davies
|-
| 2018
| Santini
| 6
| Jeremiah McGrath
| Nicky Henderson
|-
| 2019
| Birchdale
| 5
| Barry Geraghty
| Nicky Henderson
|-
| 2020
| Harry Senior
| 6
| Robbie Power
| Colin Tizzard
|-bgcolor="#eeeeee"
|2021Abandoned because of water logging
|-
| 2022
| North Lodge
| 5
| Adrian Heskin
| Alan King
|-
| 2023
| Rock My Way
| 5
| Tom Scudamore
| Syd Hosie
|}

See also
 Horse racing in Great Britain
 List of British National Hunt races

References
 Racing Post:

 pedigreequery.com – Classic Novices' Hurdle – Cheltenham.

National Hunt races in Great Britain
Cheltenham Racecourse
National Hunt hurdle races
Recurring sporting events established in 2005
2005 establishments in England